The Laurel Industrial School Historic District is a  historic district near Laurel, Virginia.  It was listed on the National Register of Historic Places in 1987, at which time it included five contributing buildings.

History 
In 1890, the Laurel Industrial School was established to "offer wayward boys an alternative to imprisonment". It was Henrico County's first public school, and it later became the Virginia Industrial School. Its complex consisted of two dormitory buildings, one of which is still standing; an administrative building; and multiple farm buildings. The community remained active when the reformatory was moved during the period of 1920–1922 to its present location as the Beaumont Learning Center in Powhatan County. The Laurel Industrial School Historic District is listed on the Virginia Historical Landmarks Register and was added in 1987 to the National Register of Historic Places.

Architecture 
The Main building, or Robert Stiles building, was built in the Romanesque-Revival-Victorian style.

References

Houses on the National Register of Historic Places in Virginia
Colonial Revival architecture in Virginia
Geography of Henrico County, Virginia
National Register of Historic Places in Henrico County, Virginia
Houses in Henrico County, Virginia
Historic districts on the National Register of Historic Places in Virginia